I Give It a Year is a 2013 romantic comedy film, written and directed by Dan Mazer and starring Rose Byrne, Rafe Spall, Anna Faris and Simon Baker. The film was based and filmed in London and was released on 8 February 2013.

I Give It a Year was Mazer's directorial debut. He was previously best known for co-writing the Sacha Baron Cohen films Borat and Brüno.

Plot
Ambitious ad exec Nat and struggling writer Josh fall in love at first sight at a party. After seven months together they decide to marry. The film highlights their struggles during their first year of marriage, switching back and forth from flashbacks of the year to a marriage-guidance counsellor's office. Their wedding goes as planned despite many friends' commenting that the marriage will not last, an embarrassing best man's speech, and a coughing priest.

When Nat returns to work after the honeymoon, she has to set up a presentation for a solvent business owner wanting to rebrand named Guy, who is from America. Her co workers tell her not to let him know she is married so they can land the account. 

Later, Josh and Nat throw a dinner party to use their wedding gifts. Some of their differences are highlighted when talking about the honeymoon in Morocco; Nat didn't enjoy the leather museum whereas Josh remembers it as interesting. When the topic changes to Chloe, Josh's former flame, Nat discovers they never officially broke up when she went to Africa for four years. In the kitchen Chloe apologises to Nat for not realising she didn't know. The women talk about the constrictions of marriage. Nat's sister Naomi has issues with her own husband's annoying habits. Josh's best man Danny asks Chloe out but is rebuffed.

It’s Christmas time and Nat tries to discourage Josh from accompanying her to a work party so she can flirt with Guy, but he is determined, irritating her. At the party, he dances embarrassingly and stands next to a poster he can joke about during the night. When he approaches Nat while she's talking with Guy, she doesn't reveal he is her husband. Guy attempts to shake him off, believing he's an unwanted menace. He asks her to dinner and Nat declines. Annoyed at Josh for embarrassing her at the party, she heads home without him.

While Nat and Josh were at her party,  Chloe is shown having dinner with her work colleagues at an Indian restaurant. She later ends up in almost threesome with the guy she was dating and a girl they work with. Chloe decides she doesn’t want to have one and leaves. The next day she calls Josh, who comes over to comfort her. They end up going Christmas shopping for Nat’s present in a lingerie shop. Chloe decides to try on a set of underwear and can’t fasten the bra so Josh comes in to help. They get caught up in the moment and kiss. During this time Nat is having a business meeting with Guy who decides to profess his feelings for her with a violinist and a dove flying around. She informs him she is married and that she needs to be with someone safe even though she wants to be with him. They both leave the hotel and shop and run into each other where Guy learns her husband is the annoying one from her party. Josh suggest that Guy and Chloe have a double date with them since they’re both from America. 

They all meet up at a bar and play pool. They all start showing signs of jealousy and trying to make each other jealous while playing pool. The night ends with them all leaving together and Nat telling Guy she needs to discuss some work things with him and Josh helps Chloe hail a cab. They start fighting about how Chloe can’t handle seeing Josh with Nat because she is in love with him and always was and that she can’t see him any longer. Nat and Guy are walking and she shoves him into a door way and they start kissing passionately. Guy makes a comment about how nice her underwear are. The same pair that Chloe was wearing when she kisses Josh. Nat tells Guy to rip the bra when he can’t get it off. Later that night Nat comes home and tells Josh they need to talk and that something is off in their marriage to which he agrees. They go to marriage counseling where the counselor suggest that they take the next 3 months to really enjoy each other and  be the best for each other. They show them trying to do that but you can tell they both still aren’t happy in their marriage. 

They finally make it to the one year anniversary and they will be going out to celebrate later. Josh hurriedly leaves and says he will meet her at the restaurant. It’s shown Josh driving to Chloe’s house where he sees Guy and Chloe leaving her apartment to go on a trip together. Nat is at home contemplating calling Guy. 

Josh arrives at the restaurant which ends up being a surprise party with their immediate family being there. He tells Nat he thinks she is the perfect wife, just not for him. He asks for a divorce and she immediately and delightedly agrees. They rejoice at the situation and immediately leave the party one after the other.

Meanwhile, Guy and Chloe are at the railway station waiting to go to Paris on a romantic trip. Josh finds them, professing his love for Chloe. When it's discovered that he split up with Nat, they are shocked. Nat appears behind Josh, who awkwardly assumed he is the one she wants to speak to, but she is there for Guy. After a short exchange they happily discuss how perfect Guy and Chloe are for them. In the end, Chloe and Guy mutually break up. Nat ends up kissing Guy and Chloe shares a kiss with Josh.

Cast

 Rose Byrne as Nat Redfern
 Rafe Spall as Josh Moss
 Anna Faris as Chloe
 Simon Baker as Guy Harrap
 Stephen Merchant as Danny
 Minnie Driver as Naomi
 Jason Flemyng as Hugh
 Olivia Colman as Linda
 Jane Asher as Diana
 Nigel Planer as Brian
 Clare Higgins as Elaine
 Sue Wallace as Janet
 Daisy Haggard as Helen

Reception
Rotten Tomatoes gives the film a score of 51%, with an average rating of 5.50/10, based on 82 reviews. The website's consensus for the film reads, "It's nowhere near as inventive as its reverse rom-com premise might suggest, but I Give It a Year is disarmingly frank -- and often quite funny." On Metacritic, the film has score of 50% based on reviews from 23 critics, indicating "mixed or average reviews".

Peter Keough of The Boston Globe wrote "Though Mazer’s ambition is laudable, he has not yet integrated the comedy of manners into the comedy of no manners." Stephanie Merry of The Washington Post wrote "In addition to some trite set pieces, writer-director Dan Mazer serves up nothing more than conspicuous cynicism masquerading as comedy."
 
Peter Bradshaw of The Guardian gave the film 3 out of 5 stars and wrote: "The result is funny and plausible, with a fair bit of newly modish Bridesmaidsy bad taste, though I kept getting the sense that the romcom template meant Mazer couldn't really let rip with pure comedy pessimism and cynicism in the way he might have liked." 
Olly Richards of Empire wrote: "The jokes are strong and delivered by a very talented cast, but the heart isn’t there. It’s easy to laugh, but hard to care."

Box office
The film accumulated a total domestic gross of $34,657 with it only generating $5,436 on its opening weekend ranking it at #77. It went on gross a worldwide total of $28,234,657.

Home media
I Give It a Year was released on DVD and Blu-ray on June 3, 2013.

References

External links

 
 
 
 
 
 
 I Give It a Year Soundtrack

2013 films
2013 directorial debut films
2013 romantic comedy films
British romantic comedy films
French romantic comedy films
English-language French films
Films directed by Dan Mazer
Films produced by Tim Bevan
Films produced by Eric Fellner
Films scored by Ilan Eshkeri
Films set in London
Films shot in London
Films with screenplays by Dan Mazer
StudioCanal films
Working Title Films films
2010s English-language films
2010s British films
2010s French films